The 2020 season was North West Thunder's first season, in which they competed in the 50 over Rachael Heyhoe Flint Trophy following reforms to the structure of women's domestic cricket in England. The side finished third in the North Group of the competition, winning two of their six matches.

After the ending of the Women's Cricket Super League in 2019, the ECB announced the beginning of a new "women's elite domestic structure". Eight teams were included in this new structure, with North West Thunder being one of the new teams, replacing Lancashire Thunder and representing North West England. Due to the impact of the COVID-19 pandemic, only the Rachael Heyhoe Flint Trophy was able to take place. North West Thunder were captained by Alex Hartley and coached by Paul Shaw. They played their home matches at Aigburth Cricket Ground, Liverpool.

Squad
North West Thunder's squad for the season is listed below. Age given is at the start of North West Thunder's first match of the season (29 August 2020).

Rachael Heyhoe Flint Trophy

North Group

Fixtures

Statistics

Batting

Bowling

Fielding

Wicket-keeping

References

North West Thunder seasons
2020 in English women's cricket